Anděl na horách is a 1955 Czechoslovak comedy film directed by Bořivoj Zeman.

Cast
 Jaroslav Marvan	as Gustav Anděl
 Milada Želenská as	Eliška Andělová
 Jaroslav Mareš as	Mirek Anděl
 Milena Dvorská as		Věra Matoušková, Mirek's girlfriend
 Vlasta Fabianová as Věra's mother
 Josef Kemr as	Bohouš Vyhlídka
 Helena Loubalová as		Věra Novotná
 Karol Machata as		Zdeněk Soukup
 Stella Zázvorková as		Mánička Vyhlídková
 Emil Bolek as	Director of Spofana
 Rudolf Deyl jr as		Puleček
 František Filipovský as		Mejzlík
 Theodor Pištěk as	Director of Dopravní podnik hl.m. Prahy

References

External links
 

1955 films
Czechoslovak comedy films
1950s Czech-language films
Czech comedy films
1955 comedy films
1950s Czech films